Animal magnetism is the name given by Franz Mesmer in the 18th century to what he believed to be an invisible natural force possessed by all living things.

Animal magnetism or Animal Magnetism may also refer to:

 Magnetoreception, the animal sense which detects magnetic fields to perceive direction, altitude or location
 Colloquially, a person's sexual attractiveness or charisma
 Animal Magnetism (Scorpions album)
 Animal Magnetism (Merzbow album)